Raja Vaaru Rani Gaaru is a 2019 Indian Telugu-language romantic drama film directed by Ravi Kiran Kola and starring debutantes Kiran Abbavaram and Rahasya Gorak.

Plot 
The film is about how Raja is scared to express his love to Rani because of his fear that he will get rejected.

Cast 
Kiran Abbavaram as Raja
Rahasya Gorak as Rani
Rajkumar Kasireddy as Chowdhury
Yazurved Gurram as Naidu

Production 
The film was shot in Kapileswarapuram, East Godavari district. Two hundred people were selected to star in the film and auditions were held to choose the right cast. Debutantes Rajkumar Kasireddy and Yazurved were brought in for comedy portions. Suresh Productions distributed the film.

Soundtrack  
Newcomer Jay Krish composed the music.

Reception 
A critic from The Times of India gave the film a rating of three out of five stars and said that "Go watch this one this weekend if you're looking for a feel-good love story that’ll leave you with a happy smile on your face". A critic from The Hindu said that "Raja Vaaru Rani Gaaru is a fun, heart warming and cute film that throws up fresh and abundant talent not just in the form of artistes but crew too".

References

External links 

2019 romantic drama films
Indian romantic drama films
Films set in Andhra Pradesh
Films shot in Andhra Pradesh
2010s Telugu-language films
Films set in Konaseema